The Liechtensteiner Volksblatt is the older of the two daily newspapers in Liechtenstein. It is published by the Liechtensteiner Volksblatt AG, and as of 2015, had a circulation of 9,000 copies. The Thursday edition is distributed as a large print run, with an estimated circulation of 21,000 copies. [1] The editorial office is located in Schaan.

In February 2023, Christine Wohlwend, the president of the board of directors, announced that the newspaper would cease publication in March 2023 due to declining subscriptions and rising costs.

History 
The newspaper was first published on 16 August 1878 [2] as the Press Association Liechtensteiner Volksblatt. The Royal Chaplain Johann Fetz was the founder and first editor, serving in that capacity until 1884.[3] Up until 1918, it was published as a weekly newspaper, until it began printing twice weekly until 1919. The company gradually increased its rate of publication, from three editions per week starting in 1927, expanding to four in 1962, and then five times a week in 1978. Since January 1985, the paper has printed every day, except Sunday.

The Oberland newspaper is generally considered to have a conservative outlook, and regularly agrees with the positions of the reigning Prince of Liechtenstein, and the Progressive Citizens' Party. Since September 2006, the paper has been published by "Liechtensteiner Volksblatt AG", a private publishing house which emerged from the former Press Club. In October 2006, the Vorarlberg media entrepreneur Eugen Russ (Vorarlberger Medienhaus) [4] also holds a minority stake in the publishing house. The majority shares are still in possession of the Royal Family of Liechtenstein.

The Liechtensteiner Volksblatt is financed through subscriptions and the sale of advertisements. The newspaper is published in the German language, and is primarily covers current affairs in Liechtenstein, though also providing some coverage of Switzerland and Austria.

Structure 
The Liechtensteiner Volksblatt is usually organised into eight sections:
 The title page, with current news
 News in Liechtenstein
 European politics, as well as some global coverage
 Business and financial section
 Sports
 Culture and arts
 Weather and industry advertisements
 Panorama

Literature  
 Wilfried Marxer: Media in Liechtenstein: structural analysis of the media landscape in a small state. Publishing the Liechtenstein Academic Society, 2004 .

References

 ↑ high jumping after:a b Key figures at a glance. In: Site of Liechtenstein Volksblatt, p. 3 (PDF; 3 kB).
 High jump↑ According to Daniel Quaderer: Liechtenstein media landscape. In: Liechtensteiner Vaterland. 25 April 2014, and S. 27 (Supplement: One Hundred Years of News).
 High jump↑ Norbert Jansen: priest, journalist, historian (Memento of 2 February 2014 Internet Archive). In: Liechtensteiner Vaterland. 10 May 2011 (PDF; 2.7 MB).According to Daniel Quaderer: Liechtenstein media landscape. In: Liechtensteiner Vaterland. 25 April 2014, and S. 27 (Supplement: One Hundred Years ofNews, "Johannes Franz Fetz»).
 Jumping Up↑ The pressure of Liechtenstein Volksblatt done in Vorarlberger Medienhaus in Schwarzach.

External links  
Liechtensteiner Volksblatt 
 Online Archive of the Liechtenstein State Library (searchable by 2005, available online until 1950.)

German-language newspapers published in Europe
Publications established in 1933
Mass media in Liechtenstein